Snorri is a crater on Mercury.  Its name was adopted by the International Astronomical Union (IAU) in 1976. Snorri is named for the Icelandic poet Snorri Sturluson.

Snorri has a prominent ray system, indicating young age.

References

Impact craters on Mercury